The  governed Japan under the leadership of Prime Minister Tomiichi Murayama from 1994 until a 1995 Cabinet Reshuffle. Murayama was elected prime minister by the National Diet on 29 June 1994 after the threat of a no-confidence vote had brought down the previous minority Hata Cabinet. Murayama's and his cabinet's formal investiture by the Emperor took place one day later.

The coalition cabinet consisted of 13 Liberal Democrats, six Socialists (including the Prime Minister) and two members of New Party Sakigake. All ministers were members of the Diet, the only woman in the cabinet was science and technology minister Makiko Tanaka.

The government lasted until January 5, 1996, when Murayama announced his resignation. The 3-party coalition continued under LDP leadership with Deputy Prime Minister Ryutaro Hashimoto becoming the new Prime Minister on January 11.

Election of the Prime Minister
The decision by the LDP to support the leader of their traditional rival, the Socialists, for Prime Minister caused a split in party ranks. Former LDP Prime Minister Toshiki Kaifu announced that he was leaving the party and was put forward by the anti-LDP coalition parties led by Tsutomu Hata and Ichirō Ozawa as their candidate for Prime Minister when the vote was held on June 29.

Since no candidate gained an absolute majority in the first round, a runoff vote between Murayama and Kaifu was held later the same day, with Murayama being elected with the support of the Japan Socialist Party, New Party Sakigake and the majority of the LDP.

Ministers of State 

R = Member of the House of Representatives
C = Member of the House of Councillors

First Cabinet

Changes 
 August 14, 1994 - Environment Minister Shin Sakurai resigned after making controversial statements related to Japan's role in the Second World War and was replaced with Sohei Miyashita
 January 20, 1995 - Sadayoshi Ozato was moved to become the Director of the Disaster Management Agency in response to the Great Hanshin earthquake, and was replaced as minister for Okinawa and Hokkaido development by Kiyoshi Ozawa.

Other positions

Reshuffled Cabinet

Changes 
 October 2 - Following the 1995 LDP Leadership election Ryutaro Hashimoto became LDP President and replaced Yōhei Kōno as Deputy Prime Minister. Both retained their ministerial portfolios.
 October 9 - Justice minister Tomoharu Tazawa resigned following a campaign finance scandal, and was replaced by Hiroshi Miyazawa. 
 November 13 - Takami Eto resigned as Director of the Management and Co-ordination agency following controversial remarks about the treatment of conquered peoples during the Second World War, and was replaced by Masateru Nakayama.

References

External links 
 Kantei/Cabinet of Japan: Murayama Cabinet 
 The New York Times, 1 July 1994: Japan's First Socialist Premier Appoints a Familiar Cabinet
 The Chicago Tribune, 26 June 1994: Japan's Short Era of Political Reform may be over

Cabinet of Japan
1994 establishments in Japan
1995 disestablishments in Japan
Cabinets established in 1994
Cabinets disestablished in 1995